Online Ceramics is a clothing company founded in Los Angeles, California in 2016 by Alix Ross and Elijah Funk. Many of their designs are tie-dyed by hand, and feature images and sayings associated with the musical act the Grateful Dead. It is located at 1500 S. Central Avenue.

The founders met in their home state of Ohio before moving to Los Angeles to start the business. In particular, Ross noted that while studying at the Columbus College of Art & Design, he became a frequent consumer of LSD, which is often referred to or visually featured in Online Ceramics' products. Their products are sold internationally at a variety of streetwear outlets, including Union in Los Angeles, Dover Street Market in London, New York City, and Los Angeles, GR8 in Tokyo, and online.

Coverage and Promotion 

As covered by The New Yorker in 2018, the small batches of shirts and hoodies produced have become noteworthy in the streetwear community, observing: "The shirts frequently sell out—which only makes them more attractive to style mavens seeking to distinguish themselves from their peers." 

The men's fashion and lifestyle magazine GQ interviewed Ross and Funk in 2017, noting that "their graphics are enormous and intricate, and include their own characters—goblins, jesters—along with druggie iconography and phrases that channel a sort of cosmic mindfulness."

Much of the brand's promotional work occurs through its official Instagram, which has 200,000 followers as of October 2021.

Partnerships 
Online Ceramics has a partnership with the independent movie studio A24, producing promotional t-shirts and sweatshirts to promote its films. The partnership was established after Ross and Funk saw the film Hereditary and contacted its writer-director, Ari Aster, in the hopes of promoting his work on t-shirts. Ultimately, the duo produced T-shirts for two of Aster's films: Hereditary and the 2019 film Midsommar. This partnership also extended to Robert Eggers' films The VVitch and The Lighthouse, the 2019 Adam Sandler/Safdie Brothers film Uncut Gems, and David Lowery's The Green Knight.

Other collaborations included a capsule set featuring the guru Ram Dass and his Netflix documentary Becoming Nobody. They created merchandise for John Mayer on the 2017, 2019, and 2021 Dead & Co. tours, as well as designing clothing to promote his Sob Rock album.

Associated 
 The Grateful Dead
 John Mayer
 Streetwear
 100 gecs
 A24
 Ari Aster
 Dover Street Market
 Hippie

References

American fashion
2000s fashion
Clothing retailers of the United States
Retail companies established in 2016
Companies based in Los Angeles
2016 establishments in the United States
2016 establishments in California
Clothing companies established in 2016
American companies established in 2016